Ensam or ENSAM may refer to:

 École nationale supérieure d'arts et métiers, former name of Arts et Métiers ParisTech
 École nationale de la sécurité et de l'administration de la mer, a grande école for the French maritime administration
 Ensam, an 1886 play by Swedish writer Alfhild Agrell
 Frida ensam, a 1975 album by Anni-Frid Lyngstad
 Alone (Strindberg novella), a 1903 novella by Swedish writer August Strindberg